Mansoor Ali Khan is an Indian actor, music composer, writer and producer. who has predominantly appeared in Tamil films, mostly in antagonistic and supporting roles. 

He got a breakthrough role as an antagonist in Captain Prabhakaran (1991). After the success of this film, he got a lot of acting opportunities. He has acted in over 250 films in all languages and has produced and directed numerous films. He has also acted in a few Malayalam, Telugu and Kannada films

Early life 
Mansoor Ali Khan was born in Dindigal, Tamil Nadu. His parents are Meesaikaara Abdul Salam Rowther and Sagorammal.

Film career
Khan has often played in antagonist roles and a few lead roles. He got a breakthrough role as an antagonist in Tamil cinema industry by the R.K. Selvamani directorial Captain Prabhakaran (1991) which became a blockbuster, hence fetching him a lot of acting opportunities. He did his acting course in Anupam Kher's acting school in Mumbai.

Political career

In his early career, Mansoor Ali Khan tried his hand at politics by supporting the Pattali Makkal Katchi (PMK). At the 1999 Indian general election in Tamil Nadu, he contested from Periyakulam as a candidate of the Puthiya Tamilagam (PT), he secured about one lakh votes and finished at the third position. At the 2009 Indian general election in Tamil Nadu, he stood as an independent candidate and the opposition pressed criminal charges against him for moving around in a vehicle with a propaganda banner breaching the moral conduct code. At the 2019 Indian general election in Tamil Nadu, he contested from Dindigul as a candidate of the Naam Tamilar Katchi (NTK). He quit the party later and formed his own political party 'Tamil Desiya Puligal'.

Legal issues
Khan was arrested in July 1998 for causing a roadblock and obstructing traffic while protesting against the pirate showings of his film Vettu Onnu Thundu Rendu (1998) on cable television. His activity led to film distributor Chinthamani Murugesan releasing a press statement condemning the television's actions and prompted a shut down of cinema halls across Pondicherry for one day.

Khan was convicted on the charge of rape and awarded him seven years of imprisonment on 27 March 2001 by session court. Later, in 2012, the Madras High court found the women had made false accusations against him and ordered the woman to pay Rs 50 lakh as damages to the actor for malicious prosecution and defamation.

Khan was arrested in January 2012 on land grabbing charges after it was alleged that he had illegally constructed a 16-storeyed property in Arumbakkam.

Khan was arrested on 17 June 2018, along with environmentalist Piyush Manush, while protesting the proposed 270-kilometre superhighway connecting Salem and Chennai.

He was arrested in April 2021 for spreading rumours about Covid vaccination and ordered to pay 2 lakhs to the health secretary.

Partial filmography

Actor

Singer

References

External links 

Indian male film actors
Male actors in Tamil cinema
Living people
Male actors in Malayalam cinema
Male actors from Tamil Nadu
Tamil film score composers
20th-century Indian male actors
21st-century Indian male actors
1961 births